Gould Dome is a dome in Alberta, Canada.

Gould Dome has the name of John Gould, an English ornithologist.

References

Geologic domes
Two-thousanders of Alberta
Alberta's Rockies